Christopher John Type (born 5 October  1981 in Merthyr Tydfil) is a British skeleton racer who has competed since 2004. He was the winner of the FIBT Men’s Inter-Continental Cup series in 2009–10 after finishing 2nd in 2008–09.
Type made his debut at World Cup level in the first race of the 2010–11 season. At the 2010 Winter Olympics in Vancouver, Type accompanied the British team as a reserve (Adam Pengilly and Kristan Bromley were chosen ahead of Type to occupy the two British spots).

Type retired in 2011 and immediately joined the British skeleton team as a coach.

World Championship record
 2011 14th

World ranking progression
 2007–08	28th
 2008–09	16th
 2009–10	12th
 2010–11 11th

References

External links
 British Skeleton Profile
Chris Type. International Bobsleigh and Skeleton Federation profile.

1981 births
Living people
Welsh male skeleton racers
Sportspeople from Merthyr Tydfil